Miroslav Lečić (Serbian Cyrillic: Мирослав Лечић; born 20 April 1985) is a Serbian professional footballer who plays as a striker.

Club career
Lečić started out at Red Star Belgrade, making one league appearance for the senior squad in the 2004–05 season. He was also sent out on loan to Radnički Obrenovac (twice), Jedinstvo Ub, Mladost Apatin (twice), and Palić. In early 2008, Lečić moved to Slovenia and joined Second League club Bonifika. He spent the next 18 months there, before returning to his country and joining his former club Radnički Obrenovac. In the 2010 winter transfer window, Lečić moved abroad for the second time and signed with Romanian side Universitatea Cluj. He also played for fellow Liga II club Otopeni, before returning to his homeland in early 2011, signing with Bežanija. Over the following years, Lečić would go on to play for three clubs in Kazakhstan (Taraz, Akzhayik, and Kyzylzhar) and four domestic clubs (Donji Srem, Jagodina twice, Zemun, and Metalac Gornji Milanovac), scoring over 40 league goals in the process.

International career
Lečić represented FR Yugoslavia at the 2002 UEFA European Under-17 Championship. He also played for Serbia and Montenegro at under-19 level.

References

External links
 
 

1985 births
Living people
Serbian footballers
Serbian expatriate footballers
Footballers from Belgrade
Serbia and Montenegro footballers
Association football forwards
Red Star Belgrade footballers
CS Otopeni players
FC Akzhayik players
FC Kyzylzhar players
FC Taraz players
FC Universitatea Cluj players
FK Bežanija players
FK Donji Srem players
FK Jagodina players
FK Jedinstvo Ub players
FK Metalac Gornji Milanovac players
FK Mladost Apatin players
FK Palić players
FK Radnički Obrenovac players
FK Zemun players
First League of Serbia and Montenegro players
Serbian SuperLiga players
Kazakhstan Premier League players
Liga II players
Serbian First League players
Serbian expatriate sportspeople in Kazakhstan
Serbian expatriate sportspeople in Romania
Serbian expatriate sportspeople in Slovenia
Expatriate footballers in Kazakhstan
Expatriate footballers in Romania
Expatriate footballers in Slovenia